Jérôme Haehnel (born 14 July 1980) is a retired French tennis player who is best known for defeating Andre Agassi in the first round of the French Open in 2004. Haehnel's career-high singles ranking is World No. 78, which he reached in February 2005. Jerome was coached by his wife and has a fear of flying.

Career highlights

1997
Defeated Roger Federer in an ITF match in Venezuela.

2004
Defeated Andre Agassi (Ranked 6th) of the United States in the first round of the French Open in 2004. Won his first and to date only ATP title in Metz by defeating compatriot Richard Gasquet in the final.

2007
During the 2007 Hopman Cup, he defeated Mardy Fish and Mark Philippoussis.

Performance timelines

Singles 

1 Held as Hamburg Masters (clay) until 2008, Madrid Masters (clay) 2009–present.

2 Held as Stuttgart Masters (indoor carpet) from 1996 to 2002, Madrid Masters (indoor hardcourt) from 2002 to 2008, Shanghai Masters (outdoor hardcourt) 2009–present.

Doubles

Wins over top 10 players

ATP career finals

Singles: 1 (1–0)

Challenger and Futures finals

Singles: 11 (7–4)

Doubles: 5 (3–2)

External links
 
 

Australian Open (tennis) junior champions
French male tennis players
Hopman Cup competitors
Sportspeople from Mulhouse
French people of German descent
Tennis players from Paris
1980 births
Living people
Grand Slam (tennis) champions in boys' doubles